Paul Huthen (died 1532) was a Roman Catholic prelate who served as Auxiliary Bishop of Mainz (1509–1532).

Biography
On 9 Jan 1509, Paul Huthen was appointed during the papacy of Pope Julius II as Auxiliary Bishop of Mainz and on 19 Jan 1509, he was appointed Titular Bishop of Ascalon. On 28 Feb 1509, he was consecrated bishop. He served as Auxiliary Bishop of Mainz until his death on 28 Apr 1532.

References

External links and additional sources
 (for Chronology of Bishops) 
 (for Chronology of Bishops)  

16th-century German Roman Catholic bishops
Bishops appointed by Pope Julius II
1532 deaths